Uniondale is a census-designated place (CDP), as well as a suburb in Nassau County, New York, on Long Island, in the Town of Hempstead. The population was 32,473 at the 2020 United States Census. Uniondale is home to Hofstra University's north campus, as well as a portion of its southern campus.

The community unsuccessfully tried incorporating itself as a village in the 1970s.

History 
In the early 1970s, Uniondale residents attempted to incorporate their hamlet as a village, citing dissatisfaction with the way their community was being represented on policy board of the committee for redeveloping Mitchel Field. Their plans were unsuccessful, and Uniondale remains an unincorporated hamlet governed by the Town of Hempstead.

In the 2010s, the neighboring CDP of East Garden City was absorbed by Uniondale in a controversial move.

Geography

The hamlet gained territory between the 2010 and 2020 Censuses due to the former CDP of East Garden City being absorbed by Uniondale.

Economy 
Lufthansa United States has its headquarters in Uniondale, moving to the hamlet from adjacent East Meadow in 2019.

At one point, Swiss International Air Lines operated its United States office at 776 RexCorp Plaza in the EAB Plaza in Uniondale. The airline moved from 41 Pinelawn Road in Melville, Suffolk County, around 2002.

Demographics

2020 census

Note: the US Census treats Hispanic/Latino as an ethnic category. This table excludes Latinos from the racial categories and assigns them to a separate category. Hispanics/Latinos can be of any race.

2000 Census
As of the census of 2000, there were 23,011 people, 6,026 households, and 4,826 families living in the CDP. The population density was 8,676.5 per square mile (3,352.7/km2). There were 6,201 housing units at an average density of 2,338.1/sq mi (903.5/km2).  The racial makeup of the CDP was 26.97% White, 55.53% Black, 0.35% Native American, 2.10% Asian, 0.08% Pacific Islander, 9.95% from other races, and 5.01% from two or more races. Hispanic or Latino of any race were 22.86% of the population.

Of the 6,026 households 39.3% had children under the age of 18 living with them, 52.9% were married couples living together, 20.9% had a female householder with no husband present, and 19.9% were non-families. Of all households 16.0% were one person and 8.5% were one person aged 65 or older. The average household size was 3.66 and the average family size was 3.95.

The age distribution was 26.5% under the age of 18, 9.7% from 18 to 24, 29.3% from 25 to 44, 21.9% from 45 to 64, and 12.6% 65 or older. The median age was 35 years. For every 100 females, there were 90.0 males. For every 100 females age 18 and over, there were 85.5 males.

The median household income was $61,410 and the median family income  was $67,264. Males had a median income of $32,417 versus $31,169 for females. The per capita income was $19,069. About 6.0% of families and 8.8% of the population were below the poverty line, including 9.0% of those under age 18 and 12.9% of those age 65 or over.

Sports 
Uniondale was formerly the home of the NHL's New York Islanders, who played at the Nassau Veterans Memorial Coliseum from 1972 until 2015, and again from 2018 until 2021. The 2014–15 NHL season was originally their final year at the Coliseum before the team moved to the Barclays Center in Brooklyn, New York City. Beginning in 2018, home games were split between Barclays and the Coliseum, and beginning in 2020, the Coliseum once again became the sole home arena for the Islanders until UBS Arena opened in 2021.

Notable people

 Richard Blais, chef, reality show contestant, restaurateur and author.
 Gary Dell'Abate, also known as Baba Booey, is longtime producer of The Howard Stern Show.  He grew up in Uniondale.
 Edward Goljan, pathologist, professor, and USMLE/COMLEX Board Review Teacher, grew up in Uniondale.
 Sheryl Lee Ralph, Broadway and film actor and singer.
 John Moschitta Jr., an American spokesperson and singer best known for his rapid speech delivery; appeared in over 100 commercials as "The Micro Machines Man", as well as in ads for FedEx.
 Aljamain Sterling, mixed martial artist, current UFC Bantamweight Champion; born and raised in Uniondale.
 Busta Rhymes, rapper, graduated from Uniondale High School

References

External links 

 Uniondale Chamber of Commerce

Census-designated places in Nassau County, New York
Hempstead, New York